Nathan DeBartolo is an Australian former professional rugby league footballer who played in the 2000s. He played for South Sydney in the NRL competition.

Background
DeBartolo played his junior rugby league for Moore Park in the local South Sydney competition.

Playing career
DeBartolo played reserve grade for South Sydney's arch rivals the Sydney Roosters and captained the reserve team in 2001 before signing with Souths for the 2002 NRL season.

DeBartolo made his first grade for South Sydney in round 16 2002 against the Newcastle Knights at the Sydney Football Stadium with the match finishing in a 26-8 loss.  DeBartolo played three further games for Souths, the last of which was a 54-0 loss against the Parramatta Eels at Parramatta Stadium in round 22 2002.

At the end of 2002, DeBartolo was released by South Sydney.  He then went on to play for the Sydney Bulls in the Ron Massey Cup competition.  In 2006, DeBartolo played in the club's grand final defeat against Newtown.  At the end of 2006, DeBartolo signed for the Leigh Centurions in England.

References

Australian rugby league players
South Sydney Rabbitohs players
1980 births
Place of birth missing (living people)
Living people
Rugby league halfbacks
Rugby league hookers